Beuron (Swabian: Beira) is a municipality in the district of Sigmaringen in Baden-Württemberg in Germany. Beuron is known for the Beuron Archabbey and the Beuron Art School for religious art.

Geography
Beuron is divided into subdistricts:
 Hausen im Donautal
 Langenbrunn
 Neidingen
 Thiergarten

Mayors
In June 2011 Raphael Osmakowski-Miller was elected mayor.

 1979–1995: Fidel Matthias Fischer
 1995–1998: Arndt Neff
 1998–2000: Gerhard Huhn (temporary)
 2000–2003: Herbert Bucher
 2003–2011: Robert Rauser
 since 2011: Raphael Osmakowski-Miller

References

External links

 Official Website of district Beuron
 Themenpark Umwelt

Sigmaringen (district)
Populated places on the Danube